
Gmina Kisielice is an urban-rural gmina (administrative district) in Iława County, Warmian-Masurian Voivodeship, in northern Poland.

Villages
Apart from the town of Kisielice, Gmina Kisielice contains the villages and settlements of Biskupiczki, Butowo, Byliny, Galinowo, Goryń, Jędrychowo, Kantowo, Klimy, Krzywka, Łęgowo, Limża, Łodygowo, Nowy Folwark, Ogrodzieniec, Pławty Wielkie, Sobiewola, Stary Folwark, Trupel, Wałdowo and Wola.

Neighbouring gminas
Gmina Kisielice is bordered by the gminas of Biskupiec, Gardeja, Iława, Łasin, Prabuty and Susz.

References
Polish official population figures 2006

Kisielice
Iława County